The discography of Malaysian-born Australian singer Che'Nelle consists of seven studio albums, two cover albums, four extended plays (EP), two compilation albums, one mixtape, and numerous solo and collaboration singles. Signing with Virgin America Music in 2005 after being discovered by Charles Dixon, Che'Nelle released her debut studio album, Things Happen for a Reason (2007). Although the album was a commercial failure in the United States, it saw success in Japan, charting in the top ten of the Oricon Albums Chart. She later was nominated for and won the Japan Gold Disc Award for Top New Artist. Following this, Che'Nelle re-located to Japan and signed with EMI Music Japan. Her second studio album, Feel Good (2010), saw moderate success, peaking at number 41 on the Oricon charts.

In 2011, Che'Nelle released an English cover of Japanese singer Tee's song "Baby I Love U", becoming one of her most successful songs in Japan. Her cover of "Baby I Love U" peaked at number 21 on the Billboard Japan Hot 100 and ranked number one on Recochoku, a ringtone download market. The song later was certified 2× Platinum by the Recording Industry Association of Japan (RIAJ) in both ringtone and PC download sales. The song later went on to revitalize the sales of Che'Nelle's cover album, Luv Songs (2011), which featured both English and Japanese songs. The album became a commercial success, peaking at number 3 on the Oricon charts and receiving a Platinum certification from the RIAJ. Her third studio album, Believe (2012), saw similar success, peaking at number two. The song "Believe", which served as the second single from the album of the same name became commercially successful in Japan, peaking at number 5 on the Billboard Japan Hot 100 and receiving multiple accolades at the 2013 Japan Gold Disc Awards. Following the Universal Music Group acquiring EMI's music operations, Che'Nelle along with all other former EMI Music Japan artists were transferred to the EMI Records Japan label. She released her third studio album, Aishiteru (2013), which peaked at number two. Later that year, Feel Good and Luv Songs were reissued by Universal Music Japan. A greatest hits album, Best Songs (2013), was also released by Universal Japan near the end of 2013, peaking at number 4. The compilation featured songs with Tee, Leo and Ai, as well as songs from Che'Nelle's debut album.

In 2014, Che'Nelle transferred to Delicious Deli Records, which operated under Universal Japan's international division. She released her second cover album, Luv Songs 2 (2014), under the label. The album became her second album to not chart in the top ten of the Oricon Albums chart, peaking at number 12. In 2014, Che'Nelle released the single "Happiness". Although the physical single peaked at number 25 on the Oricon Singles Chart, "Happiness" became Che'Nelle's highest charting song on the Japan Hot 100, peaking at number 2. The song later served as the lead single for her fifth studio album, @Chenelleworld (2015). Within that year, Che'Nelle released a cover of Adele's "Hello" independently outside of Japan.

In 2017, Che'Nelle released the single "Destiny". The song served as the theme song for the Japanese drama Reverse. The song peaked at number 36 on the Oricon Singles Chart and number 4 on the Japan Hot 100, receiving a Platinum download certification from the RIAJ. The song served as the lead single for the album of the same name, which was released shortly after. Destiny (2017), which served as Che'Nelle's sixth studio album, peaked at number 9 on the Billboard Japan Hot Albums chart and number 10 on the Oricon charts. Three months later, Che'Nelle released her seventh and most recent studio album, Metamorphosis (2017). The album was released in celebration of Che'Nelle's tenth anniversary of her debut. Metamorphosis became Che'Nelle's lowest charting album, peaking at 93 on the Oricon charts. With the release of Metamorphosis, Che'Nelle completed her multi-record deal with Universal Japan. Near the end of 2017, Che'Nelle independently released an EP, Calm Before the Storm. The EP was released exclusively outside of Asia. In December 2017, Universal Japan released Che'Nelle's second greatest hits album, 10th Anniversary All Time Best.

Studio albums

Compilation albums

Cover albums

Extended plays

Mix tapes

Singles

As a lead artist

As a featured artist

Promotional singles

Other appearances

References 
Discographies of Malaysian artists
Discographies of Australian artists
Pop music discographies
Contemporary R&B discographies